The 1932–33 Illinois Fighting Illini men's basketball team represented the University of Illinois.

Regular season
Craig Ruby entered the 1932–33 season tied with Ralph Jones as the winningest coach in the history at the University of Illinois with 85 wins.  Ruby had 9 returning lettermen from a team that had finished in fifth place in the Big Ten the year before.  The team went through a nearly perfect non-conference season, losing only 1 game, however, the Fighting Illini showed no improvement in conference play by finishing with a record of 6 wins and 6 losses. The team finished the season with an overall record of 11 wins 7 losses.  The starting lineup included captain Boyd Owen and Albert Kamm at guard, Frank Froschauer and Coslon Bennett as forwards and Hudson Hellmich at center.

Roster

Source

Schedule

|-	
!colspan=12 style="background:#DF4E38; color:white;"| Non-Conference regular season
|- align="center" bgcolor=""

|-	
!colspan=9 style="background:#DF4E38; color:#FFFFFF;"|Big Ten regular season

Bold Italic connotes conference game
												
Source

Awards and honors

References

Illinois Fighting Illini
Illinois Fighting Illini men's basketball seasons
1933 in sports in Illinois
1934 in sports in Illinois